Rock Dell is an unincorporated area in the rural municipality of Garry No. 245, in the Canadian province of Saskatchewan. Rock Dell is located approximately 5 km south of Highway 52 on Range road 74 in eastern Saskatchewan.

See also

List of communities in Saskatchewan
List of rural municipalities in Saskatchewan

Ghost towns in Saskatchewan
Garry No. 245, Saskatchewan
Unincorporated communities in Saskatchewan
Division No. 9, Saskatchewan